Turybanino is a rural locality (a village) in Sheybukhtovskoye Rural Settlement, Mezhdurechensky District, Vologda Oblast, Russia. The population was 19 as of 2002.

Geography 
Turybanino is located 20 km southwest of Shuyskoye (the district's administrative centre) by road. Yusovo is the nearest rural locality.

References 

Rural localities in Mezhdurechensky District, Vologda Oblast